Richard Purcell of Loughmoe (died 15 September 1624) was the fourth-to-last Baron of Loughmoe and the father of Theobald Purcell, Baron of Loughmoe. The former commissioned the extension of Loughmoe castle to be constructed, and was a member of a Jury in Clomnel. In February of 1612, Richard Purcell, John Tobin of Killogh and Pierce Butler of Knockgraffon were summoned to court at Clomnel and brought before the "Justice Loather" Chief Baron Methwolde, and were forced to pay a fine of 200 English pounds, and for the rest of the Jury, 40 English pounds. Richard Purcell was an "Anglo-Irish against the Queen Elizabeth I."

References

1624 deaths
Irish feudal barons
Date of birth missing